The men's medley relay was run for the first time at the 1908 Summer Olympics in London. The event consisted of 1600 metres being run by four athletes per team. Unlike the later 4 × 400 metres relay, however, the athletes had different distances to run. In the medley, the first two runners each ran 200 metres. The third runner ran 400 and the fourth ran 800. The competition was held on July 24, 1908, and July 25, 1908. 28 runners from 7 nations competed. NOCs could enter one team of four, with four reserves.

The event was run in two rounds.

Results

First round
All first round heats were held on July 24, 1908.

First round, heat 1

Simon had a ten-yard lead over Laaftman at the end of the 200 metre leg; after Lindberg gained on Racz, Stenborg passed Nagy during the 400 metre leg, giving Björn a three-yard advantage over Bodor to begin the second half of the race. Bodor was up to the task, and ran the split in 1:56.6 to pass Björn and win a close contest by three yards.

First round, heat 2

The German team dominated this heat, with each runner increasing the lead: Braun crossed the finish line 90 yards ahead of Evers.

First round, heat 3

Hamilton gave the Americans a slight lead at the end of the first 200 metres, with the Canadians in second and the British in third. 

Cartmell increased the lead as Pankhurst caught up to Buddo near the end of the second 200. In the 400 leg, Taylor held the American lead while Montague ensured second place for the Britons.

Just had little chance of catching Sheppard, who had won the individual 800 metres, in the second half of the race, and Sheppard crossed the finish line 25 yards in front of the British team.

Final
The final was held on July 25, 1908.

At the end of the first 200 metres, Hamilton had a six-yard lead over Simon, with Hoffmann about a yard behind the Hungarian. Cartmell and Taylor increased the American lead, and Sheppard, who began the second half of the race with a fifteen-yard lead over Bodor,  pulled away to win by twenty-five yards.

Braun and Bodor had a duel for second place, with the German, who had a five-yard deficit at the beginning of the 800 metres, winning an exciting contest by five inches.

References

 Official Report of the Games of the IV Olympiad (1908).
 

Medley relay
1908